Dejan Terzić (21 April 1987 in Bečej, SR Serbia, Yugoslavia) is a Serbian sprint canoer.

He won a bronze medal in the K-4 1000 m event at the 2012 Canoe Sprint European Championships in Zagreb.

References
 Biography
 EC bronze medal

1987 births
Living people
People from Bečej
Serbian male canoeists
Olympic canoeists of Serbia
Canoeists at the 2012 Summer Olympics
European Games competitors for Serbia
Canoeists at the 2015 European Games
Mediterranean Games silver medalists for Serbia
Competitors at the 2013 Mediterranean Games
Mediterranean Games medalists in canoeing